Jorge Oswaldo Salas Williams (born November 3, 1962) is a Peruvian film, TV and theater actor.

Early life 
Salas was born in Lima, Perú. Before dedicating himself to acting, he studied at the University of Lima where he obtained a bachelor's degree in Industrial Engineering.

Career
He studied dramatic art at the Club de Teatro of Lima and several acting workshops.

His career as an actor began in the theater in 1990 with his group "Comunicando" that released several works. The most praised by both the public and the critics was Cyrano de Bergerac by Edmond Rostand, directed by Ruth Escudero. This work was named one of the five best plays premiered in Lima in 1994. It was re-released in 1995 with the same success.

His TV debut was in the 2008 successful Peruvian series "Sally, la Muñequita del Pueblo" in which he starred in the secondary role of "Pepito." In 2013 he starred in the episode "Morir por un ideal" in the Peruvian series "Historias detrás de la muerte". In 2017 he performed in the miniseries "Santa Rosa de Lima", a Peruvian co-production with the cable television network EWTN in his first antagonistic role of priest-prosecutor Francisco Verdugo.

His first film appearance was in the Peruvian film "Vidas Paralelas" in 2008.

In 2009, along with three other Peruvian actors, he provided the voices for the award-winning animated Peruvian-Argentinean film Rodencia y el Diente de la Princesa (A Mouse Tale) by David Bisbano. In 2010 he traveled to Buenos Aires, Argentina, to perform the final dubbing of the three voices (Blue the Wizard, General Rat and Edam Grandfather). He was the only Peruvian actor, whose voices were heard in the film.

In 2011, he performed in the Peruvian feature film "La Casa Rosada" by director Palito Ortega Matute. The film was finally released in 2018. Its success was hailed by audiences as well as critics.

In 2012 he worked in the multi-award-winning Peruvian film Extirpador de Idolatrías (Extirpator of Idolatries) by Manuel Siles, in which he performed the main character, police detective Waldo Mamani. In this role he won the Best Actor Award at Encuentro Mundial de Cine, in Denver, United States and at CinemAvvenire Film Festival in Rome, Italy in 2014. After the premiere in Peru in 2016, the film critic Sebastián Pimentel, from El Comercio newspaper, praised his performance with the words: "the great Oswaldo Salas". In late 2016, he was nominated by the same newspaper for Best Film Actor at Premios Luces.

In Colombia, in 2015 he starred in one of the stories of the Colombian feature film "Los Suicidios de Sara" by director Miguel Urrutia. In Peru he starred in the short film "Sonata Para un Calendario" by director Carmenrosa Vargas. The film was shown in numerous international film festivals.

In 2016 he performed in "Vivir Ilesos", the second feature film by director Manuel Siles, which premiere in Peru was on October 31, 2019.

In 2017 for the first time he was offered the role as antagonist in a film in the short film "Monstruo" by director Macarena Sturmo.

In 2018 he starred in the short film Pisahueco (Holestepper) by director Sergio Fernández Muñoz, which won in 2019 the National Short Film Contest of the Audiovisual, Phonography and New Media Department (DAFO) of the Ministry of Culture of Peru. In the evaluation report of the jury they praise his performance: "he provides an outstanding performance". He is nominated for Best Actor of the Month in January 2020 at the 12 Months Film Festival in Romania and wins the Award for Best Acting Performance in Short Film at the Košice International Monthly Film Festival in Slovakia in April 2020, the Best Actor Award at the Monthly Indie Shorts in June 2020 and more than a dozen awards at other international film festivals.

He is selected to be the first Pan American Torch Bearer of the Lima 2019 Pan American Games on the stretch of the city of Ica. 

He is invited to be a member of the Jury of the International Competition at the León International Film Festival, Guanajuato, Mexico, to be held in November 2020.

Filmography

Film

Television

Videoclip

Theater

Awards and nominations

References

External links
 

1962 births
Living people
Peruvian male actors
Male actors from Lima